The Abraham Lincoln Brigade, officially the XV International Brigade (XV Brigada Internacional), was a mixed brigade that fought for the Spanish Republic in the Spanish Civil War as a part of the International Brigades.

The brigade mustered at Albacete in Spain, in January 1937, comprising mainly English-speaking volunteers – arranged into the mostly British Saklatvala Battalion and the mostly North American Lincoln Battalion. It also included two non-English-speaking battalions, the Balkan Dimitrov Battalion and the Franco-Belgian Sixth February Battalion. It fought at Jarama, Brunete, Boadilla, Belchite, Fuentes de Ebro, Teruel and the Ebro River.

The brigade's songs were "Jarama Valley" and "Viva la Quince Brigada".

History
The XVth Brigade first fought at the Battle of Jarama in February 1937 and suffered many casualties. The British lost 225 men out of 600, the Lincolns 120 out of 500. After the battle, the brigade was seriously under-strength.

At the end of March, a Spanish battalion, Voluntario 24 (the 24th Volunteers), joined the brigade. Over the next few months, under the close supervision of Janos Galicz, the brigade was re-organised into two regiments of about 1,200 men. He appointed "the gallant major", George Nathan, as brigade Chief of Staff.

The first regiment, commanded by Jock Cunningham, with Harry Haywood as political commissar, was English-speaking and comprised the depleted British and Lincolns, as well as the recently formed but under-strength second battalion of American volunteers, the George Washington Battalion. The second regiment was commanded by Major "Chapaiev" (Mihaly Szalvay) and consisted of the Dimitrov Battalion, the Sixth February Battalion and the Voluntario 24 Battalion.

This was the composition in July 1937 for the Battle of Brunete. As with the Battle of Jarama, the brigade suffered huge casualties; the brigade strength was reduced from six to four battalions. In particular, the two American battalions were so depleted that they merged to form the Lincoln-Washington Battalion. (This name did not last: it was renamed the Lincoln Battalion in October 1937.) The 6 February, which also suffered severe casualties, was transferred after Brunete.  After Belchite, the nominally Canadian Mackenzie-Papineau Battalion joined the brigade, while the Dimitrov Battalion departed.

During the fall of 1937 the units of the International Brigade were integrated into the Spanish Popular Army and the Battalions were re-numbered. The British Bn became the 57th, the Lincoln-Washington the 58th, the Spanish (formerly known as the 24th), became the 59th and the Mackenzie-Papineau the 60th. The battalion line-up remained stable through the withdrawal of the Internationals during the Ebro Campaign.

The XVth International Brigade also included volunteers from Latin America, who, after incidents of bad treatment from North Americans, left the international Brigades and joined other units such as El Campesino's First Mobile Shock Brigade.

After an invitation from J. B. S. Haldane, American singer and activist Paul Robeson traveled to Spain in 1938 because he believed in the International Brigades' cause, visited the hospital of the Benicàssim, singing to the wounded soldiers. Robeson also visited the battlefront and provided a morale boost to the Republicans at a time when their victory was unlikely. 

On 13 March 2015, Dan Kaufman interviewed Del Berg, a 99-year-old veteran of the Abraham Lincoln Brigade, who he described as the last known survivor of the Brigade. Berg died 28 February 2016.

Overview of battalions

{| class="wikitable"
|-
! Date joined
! Number
! Battalion Name
! Composition
! Date left
! Comments
|-
| 31 Jan 1937
| 16th/57th
| Saklatvala Battalion
| British, Irish, Dominion
| 23 Sep 1938
| Demobilized
|-
| 31 Jan 1937
| 17th/58th
| Lincoln Battalion
| American, Canadian, Irish, British
| 23 Sep 1938
| Demobilized
|-
| 31 Jan 1937
| 18th
| Dimitrov Battalion
| Bulgarian, Greek and Yugoslav
| 20 Sep 1937
| Moved to 45th Div. Reserve
|-
| 31 Jan 1937
| 19th
| Sixth February Battalion
| French and Belgian
| 4 Aug 1937
| Moved to 14th Brigade
|-
| 14 Mar 1937
| 24th/59th
| Voluntario 24 Battalion
| Cuban
| 10 Nov 1937
| Moved to a Spanish Mixed brigade
|-
| 29 Jun 1937
| 60th
| Mackenzie-Papineau Battalion
| American and Canadian
| 23 Sep 1938
| Demobilized
|-
| 4 Jul 1937
| 20th
| Washington Battalion
| American
| 14 Jul 1937
| Merged with Lincoln Battalion
|}
 Sub-battalion units attached to the Brigade
 Brigade Anti-Tank Company
 XVth Brigade Photographic Unit (Aug 1937 – Sep 1938) Archive
 Connolly Column

Notable members 

 Delmer Berg – American political activist
 Edward A. Carter Jr. – American Medal of Honor recipient
 Theodore Cogswell – American science fiction writer
 Fred Copeman – English battalion commander
 Milan Ćopić – Yugoslav prison warden
 Vladimir Ćopić – Yugoslav brigade commander
 Jock Cunningham – Scottish battalion commander
 Petar Dapčević – Yugoslav commander
 Ralph Fasanella – American painter
 Janos Galicz – Hungarian division commander
 William Herrick – American novelist
 Jack Jones – English company commissar
 Oliver Law – American battalion commander
 James Maley – Scottish political activist
 Roland Masferrer – Cuban political activist
 Robert Hale Merriman – American brigade chief of staff
 Conlon Nancarrow – American-Mexican composer
 George Nathan – British brigade chief of staff
 Paddy O'Daire – Irish battalion commander
 Abe Osheroff – American activist
 Edwin Rolfe – American commissar
 William Lindsay Gresham – American novelist, volunteer medic
 Frank Ryan – Irish commissar

See also
 American Medical Bureau

References

Citations

Sources 
 Books
 
 
 Good basic introduction to the subject in a readable and well-illustrated format.  Author made several visits to battlefields and interviewed veterans in the 1980s and 90s. 
 
  
 
 

 Websites
 EPR Order of Battle Website 
  Associació Catalana Website

Further reading

External links 
 Abraham Lincoln Brigade Archives, Tamiment Library and Robert F. Wagner Labor Archives at NYU.

International Brigades
Military units and formations disestablished in 1939
Military units and formations established in 1937
Mixed Brigades (Spain)

eo:Brigado Abraham Lincoln
fr:Brigade Abraham Lincoln
pl:Brygada im. Abrahama Lincolna
ru:XV интербригада имени Авраама Линкольна
sl:15. mednarodna brigada »Lincoln«
fi:Abraham Lincolnin prikaati